Reductoderces cawthronella is a moth of the Psychidae family. It was described by Alfred Philpott in 1921 and named in honour of the Cawthron Institute. It is endemic to New Zealand and has been collected in Nelson on the Maitai Valley side of the Botanical Hill. The larvae inhabits a fragile, pear shaped case and it has been hypothesised that they are lichen or alga browsers. Larvae pupate at the end of June and adults emerge at the beginning of August until the middle of October.

Taxonomy

This species was first described by Alfred Philpott in 1921, using adult moths reared from larvae collected on the Maitai Valley side of Botanical Hill in Nelson, and named Taleporia cawthronella. Philpott named this species in honour of the Cawthron Institute as this species was the first to be reared at its insectarium. This species was illustrated and discussed in 1928 by George Hudson using the name Taleporia cawthronella. In 1972 J. S. Dugdale placed this species in the genus Reductoderces. This placement was confirmed by Dugdale in 1988. The male holotype is held in the New Zealand Arthropod Collection.

Description
Philpott described the adults of this species as follows:

The larva inhabits a fragile case which is pear shaped and is approximately 6mm long and 3.5 mm wide. Hudson described the larvae of this species as follows:

Distribution

This species is endemic to New Zealand. It has been collected in Nelson.

Hosts 
It has been hypothesised that larvae in this genus are lichen or alga-browsers.

Behaviour and life cycle 
The larvae inhabit a case made from fragments of a white lichen. It travels in the case by extending its head and throax and then lifting the case clear and forward. The larvae pupate at the end of June by attaching its case to a stone, twig or leaf. The attachment enables the case to swing in multiple directions. The adults emerge from the beginning of August until the middle of October.

References

Moths described in 1921
Moths of New Zealand
Psychidae
Endemic fauna of New Zealand
Taxa named by Alfred Philpott
Endemic moths of New Zealand